Hemnes is a municipality in Nordland county, Norway. It is part of the Helgeland traditional region. The administrative centre of the municipality is the village of Korgen. Other villages include Bjerka, Bleikvasslia, Hemnesberget, and Sund.

The municipality sits south of the Ranfjorden and stretches south and east toward the border with Sweden. The E6 highway enters Hemnes from the west through the Korgfjell Tunnel from Vefsn.

The  municipality is the 49th largest by area out of the 356 municipalities in Norway. Hemnes is the 194th most populous municipality in Norway with a population of 4,420.

General information
This municipality was established in 1839 when the old municipality of Rana was divided into Sør-Rana and Nord-Rana, shortly after the Formannskapsdistrikt law went into effect. Soon after, in 1844, Sør-Rana was renamed Hemnes.

On 1 July 1918, the southern district of Hemnes (population: 1,369) was separated to become the new municipality of Korgen. This left Hemnes with 3,567 residents. A few months later on 1 January 1919, the eastern area of Bardal (population: 4) was transferred to the neighboring municipality of Nesna. Then on 1 July 1929, Hemnes was split into three municipalities: Sør-Rana, Elsfjord, and Hemnes. After this, the municipality of Hemnes only consisted of the village of Hemnesberget and the area immediately around it (population: 1,077). During the 1960s, there were many municipal mergers across Norway due to the work of the Schei Committee. On 1 January 1964, the municipalities of Korgen, Hemnes, the extreme northern part of Hattfjelldal Municipality, and the southern part of Sør-Rana Municipality were all merged to form a new, larger municipality of Hemnes.

Name
The municipality (originally the parish) is named after the old Hemnes farm (now called Hemnesberget) since the first Hemnes Church was built there.

Coat of arms
The coat of arms was granted on 4 April 1986. The official blazon is "Azure, boat clamps Or". This means the arms have a blue field (background) and the charge is a boat clamp. The clamp has a tincture of Or which means it is commonly colored yellow, but if it is made out of metal, then gold is used. The blue color in the field symbolizes the importance of the ocean. The clamp was chosen because shipbuilding has long been a tradition in the municipality. To symbolize shipbuilding, it was decided to use the clamp which is used to keep the wooden flanks of the ships together. The arms were designed by Anne Lofthus Valla.

Churches
The Church of Norway has three parishes within the municipality of Hemnes. It is part of the Indre Helgeland prosti (deanery) in the Diocese of Sør-Hålogaland.

History

Second World War
As part of their drive on Northern Norway, a detachment of three hundred German soldiers landed at Hemnes from the captured Norwegian coastal steamer SS Nordnorge on 10 May 1940 and captured the municipality from a platoon of British soldiers from No. 1 Independent Company, despite a spirited defence in the streets of Hemnesberget. A Royal Navy task force consisting of the anti-aircraft cruiser Calcutta and destroyer Zulu sank the former Norwegian steamer and shelled the German forces in the town, but were unable to dislodge the German landing force.

A Norwegian Army detachment attempted a counterattack against the German's positions, but was driven back. The town was again bombarded on 12 May by a passing Royal Navy force without significant effect, leaving Hemnes in German control for the rest of the war.

Government
All municipalities in Norway, including Hemnes, are responsible for primary education (through 10th grade), outpatient health services, senior citizen services, unemployment and other social services, zoning, economic development, and municipal roads. The municipality is governed by a municipal council of elected representatives, which in turn elect a mayor.  The municipality falls under the Rana District Court and the Hålogaland Court of Appeal.

Municipal council
The municipal council of Hemnes is made up of 23 representatives that are elected to four year terms. The party breakdown of the council is as follows:

Mayors
The mayors of Hemnes (incomplete list):

1964-1967: Kristen Pettersen Øverleir (Ap)
1968-1975: Ole Brygfjeld (Ap)
1976-1979: Harald Gullesen (Ap)
1980-1983: Nils Nermark (H)
1984-1995: Ørnulf Skjæran (Ap)
1996-1999: Nils Valla (Sp)
1999-2003: Per Jomar Hoel (Sp)
2003-2011: Kjell-Idar Juvik (Ap)
2011-2015: Kjell Joar Petersen-Øverleir (H)
2015-2019: Christine Trones (H)
2019-present: Paul Asphaug (Sp)

Geography
The lake Røssvatnet is a lake and reservoir lying partially in the southern part of Hemnes. It has been the site of human occupation since the Stone Age. Its area of  makes it the second largest lake in Norway by surface area. Other lakes include Bleikvatnet, Grasvatnet, Stormålvatnet, and Stormyrbassenget.

The Okstindan mountain range is located in Hemnes, including the mountain Oksskolten. The large Okstindbreen glacier sits atop the mountain range.

Notable people 

 Kristen Rivertz, (Norwegian Wiki) (1862–1937), architect
 Johan Albrigt Rivertz (1874 in Korgen – 1942) a judge on the Supreme Court of Norway
 Erling Falk (1887 in Hemnesberget - 1940) a Norwegian politician, ideologist and writer
 Christen Finbak, (Norwegian Wiki) (1904–1954) chemist and physicist
 Egil Kraggerud (born 1939 in Hemnes) a Norwegian philologist
 Laila Stien (born 1946 in Hemnes) a novelist, poet and author of children's literature
 Gerd-Liv Valla (born 1948) a former trade union leader, grew up near Bjerka 
 Reidar Sørensen (born 1956 in Hemnesberget) a Norwegian stage and film actor 
 Kjell-Idar Juvik (born 1966 in Hemnesberget) a politician, Mayor of Hemnes 2003–2011
 Børge Petersen-Øverleir (born 1967 in Hemnesberget) a Norwegian guitarist

References

External links
Municipal fact sheet from Statistics Norway 

 
Municipalities of Nordland
1839 establishments in Norway